Miroslav Duben (born November 8, 1974) is a Czech professional ice hockey defenceman. He played with BK Mladá Boleslav in the Czech Extraliga during the 2010–11 Czech Extraliga season.

References

External links 
 
 

1974 births
Living people
BK Mladá Boleslav players
Czech ice hockey defencemen
Sportspeople from Havlíčkův Brod
HK Nitra players
BK Havlíčkův Brod players
HC Karlovy Vary players
HC Dukla Jihlava players
HC Dynamo Pardubice players
Czech expatriate ice hockey players in Slovakia
HC Bílí Tygři Liberec players